Wilhelm "Willi" Friedrich Weber (born 11 March 1942 in Regensburg, Germany) is a former manager of German racing drivers including seven-time Formula One champion Michael Schumacher (until 2012), his brother Ralf Schumacher (until November 2005), Nico Hülkenberg (until 2011), and Timo Scheider. He was also the franchise holder for A1 Team Germany.

Weber made himself a name in motorsport by discovering and promoting talents like the Schumacher brothers and for his reptuation as a shrewd negotiator. Besides managing his clients' contracts, he was also successful at making profitable merchandising deals for his clients.

Early career
As a teenager, Weber trained his negotiating skills by buying worn military uniforms and reselling them to collectors. At the same time, he undertook an apprenticeship in hotel management, with the goal of running his own gastronomic establishment. He succeeded as an entrepreneur with his businesses being based near Stuttgart, Germany, and became a wealthy man with franchises. As a motorsport fan, he spent time and a good part of his wealth behind the wheel of race cars. In 1983, engineer Klaus Trella talked Weber into a partnership and they founded their Formula 3 team WTS (Weber-Trella Stuttgart). Realising that he wasn't a front-runner on the track, Weber made room for ambitious youngsters and enjoyed his status as team owner. The first success came in 1988 with talented Swabian driver Joachim Winkelhock, who won the team's first German F3 Championship title.

Talent scout and manager
During a Formula Ford race at the Salzburgring in Austria later that year, Weber, on the search for his next top driver as Winkelhock moved on to Formula One, spotted a young man who was racing for the first time in that category and comfortably won the race. It was the teenaged Michael Schumacher from Kerpen. Weber invited Schumacher to test his F3 car in Hockenheim and became convinced this young man would go far. It was Weber's sole credit that Schumacher would be able to continue his career as his humble origins would not have allowed to come up with the funds for a season in the German F3 Championship. In his second season in the series, Schumacher duly won the title which propelled his career further. It was also thanks to the connections of a close friend of Weber's to motorsport returnee Mercedes-Benz that Schumacher ended up in their Junior Team in Group C racing and later had the financial guarantees to back his Grand Prix debut in Spa in 1991 for Jordan Grand Prix.
Michael Schumacher winning the Formula One World Championship in 1994 transformed Germany into a nation passionate about motor racing. The enormous following and therefore the business opportunities arising meant a heavy workload for Weber. When Schumacher, the first ever German F1 World Champion, successfully defended his title in 1995, Weber decided to focus all of his time on F1 and sold his F3 outfit.

Weber has since been responsible, thanks to his shrewd negotiation skills, for Michael Schumacher turning into one of the highest-earning sports stars ever, and his 15% commission for every deal he finalised for his clients made him an even wealthier man. Schumacher won a further five titles in the 21st century.

Outside motorsport
Top models like Claudia Schiffer and Naomi Campbell have also been represented by Weber’s management firm, which is based right next to Stuttgart Airport.

In 1999, Weber, ever passionate about gastronomy, inaugurated his restaurant Weber's Gourmet im Turm at the Fernsehturm Stuttgart but after a couple of years discontinued the project.

References

Grand Prix Insider 1995 by author Mario-Alberto Bauér, Chronosports, Switzerland

1942 births
Living people
Formula One people
A1 Grand Prix team owners
Sportspeople from Regensburg
German sports agents
Motorsport agents
German motorsport people